Mohit Suri is an Indian film director. Born into the Bhatt family, he is well known for directing the films Murder 2  (2011), the musical romance Aashiqui 2 (2013) and the romantic thrillers Awarapan (2007), Ek Villain (2014) and Malang (2020). He has been married to Udita Goswami since 2013.

Early life
Mohit Suri was born and brought up in Mumbai. His father Daksh Suri worked for Dunlop in Chennai and his mother was an air hostess. He has one sister, former actress Smiley Suri.

Career
After working as an office assistant for T-Series as well as assistant director in Vikram Bhatt's films Kasoor (2001), Awara Paagal Deewana (2002) and Footpath (2003), Suri made his directorial debut with the moderately successful Zeher (2005) and then directed movies like Kalyug (2005), Woh Lamhe (2006), Awarapan (2007), Raaz: The Mystery Continues (2009) and Crook (2010).

Suri's breakthrough period begun with the unexpected earning of his psychological thriller Murder 2 (2011). It is one of the highest grossing Hindi film of 2011. Followed by the highly successful musical love stories Aashiqui 2 (2013) and Ek Villain (2014), with the latter being a revenge drama too and entering 100 Crore Club in India.
Post the debacle of his majorly anticipated dramas Hamari Adhuri Kahani (2015) and Half Girlfriend (2017), he garnered critical and commercial success via the romantic suspense thriller Malang (2020). Recently released Ek Villain Returns (2022) with John Abraham and Arjun Kapoor.

Suri's upcoming and forthcoming directorials include, Untitled movie with Varun Dhawan and Malang 2.

Other works

Apart from his occupation as a director, Suri was the judge of Star Plus's dance reality series Nach Baliye 8 and formed EMI Records India, one of the best musical platforms in India, which produced singers like Yash Narvekar, Anushka Shahaney etc.

Personal life

In 2013, Suri married former Indian actress Udita Goswami. The couple have a son (b. 2015) and daughter (b. 2018).

Filmography
Director 

Assistant Director

References

External links 

 
 

21st-century Indian film directors
Hindi-language film directors
Film directors from Mumbai
Living people
1981 births